The D.I.C.E. Award for Outstanding Achievement in Character is an award presented annually by the Academy of Interactive Arts & Sciences during the academy's annual D.I.C.E. Awards. This award is "presented to the individual or team whose work has furthered the interactive experience through the creation of a memorable character within an interactive title. Outstanding character takes into consideration the marriage of voice acting and performance (motion capture work), character design and execution, and writing." There were originally separate awards for female and male characters, but eventually into one category at the 11th Annual Interactive Achievement Awards in 2008.

The most recent was for Kratos, portrayed by Christopher Judge and written by Richard Gaubert, from God of War Ragnarök, developed by Santa Monica Studio and published by Sony Interactive Entertainment.

History 
There used to be separate awards presented for a female character performance and a male character performance. Over the years it would go back and forth between Outstanding Achievement in Character Performance and Outstanding Character Performance. Before being simplified to just Outstanding Achievement in Character in 2015.
Outstanding Achievement in Character Performance - Female (2004, 2007)
Outstanding Achievement in Character Performance - Male (2004, 2007)
Outstanding Character Performance - Female (2005–2006)
Outstanding Character Performance - Male (2005–2006)
Outstanding Character Performance (2008–2009, 2011, 2014)
Outstanding Achievement in Character Performance (2010, 2012)
Outstanding Achievement in Character - Male or Female (2013)
Outstanding Achievement in Character (2015–present)

Winners and nominees

2000s

2010s

2020s

Multiple nominations and wins

Developers and publishers 
Sony has published the most nominees and the most winners. Sony's subsidiary Naughty Dog has developed the most nominees. Valve has developed the most winners. Electronic Arts and Microsoft Game Studios are the only publishers with back-to-back winners. Electronic Arts published back-to-back winners for a Male Character in 2004 and 2005. Microsoft published back-to-back winners for a Female Character in 2006 and 2007. Electronic Arts and Microsoft had published both winners for a Female Character and a Male Character in 2005 and 2007, respectively. Ubisoft has published the most nominees without publishing a single winner, and its subsidiary Ubisoft Montreal has developed the most nominees without developing a single winner.

Franchises 
There have been a lot of games with more than one nomination in a single year. Uncharted is the only franchise so far to have had multiple nominees in the same year more than once. Uncharted has also received the most nominations, but has never actually won. The God of War and Portal franchises are the only franchises so far to have won more than once with God of War being the most award-winning franchise. Infamous is the only franchise to have more than one nomination for more than one game in a single year.

Notes

References 

D.I.C.E. Awards
Awards established in 2004